The Rio Bravo Conservation and Management Area is a nature reserve located in northwestern Belize. Rio Bravo, as it is known, was established by Programme for Belize in 1988 with the purchase of 110,044 acres (44,533.2 hectares) of land from Gallon Jug Agroindustries. With logging encroachment imminent in 1989, the Nature Conservancy joined Programme for Belize to protect the land. Rio Bravo is the largest terrestrial conservation area in Belize, comprising 4% of the country's total land area.

Habitat, flora, and fauna
Rio Bravo is host to a wide variety of habitats including:
Belizean pine forest
Secondary palm/broadleaf forest
Marsh forest
Freshwater lagoon

Surveys of Rio Bravo have yielded over 70 mammal species (greater than 50% bats) and 392 bird species (25% of which are nearctic migrants).  Detailed inventories of fish and invertebrates have not yet been undertaken.  Twenty-two vegetation types are encompassed by the boundaries of the conservation area, and support 230 tree species.
Species of conservation concern found within the conservation area include the yellow-headed amazon, Morelet's crocodile, and the Central American river turtle.

Physical geology and climate
Rio Bravo sits atop an extension of the Yucatán Platform, which is composed mostly of Cretaceous to early Pleistocene limestone, although dolomite and evaporites are also present at various depths.  Alluvial sands have been deposited over the limestones over extensive areas during the Pleistocene. The principal topographical features are a series of escarpments aligned southwest-northeast, which also guide the drainage of the Rio Bravo, Booth's River and New River systems.  Overall elevation of the site ranges from 13–790 feet.
The area is subject to a 3 month dry season between February and April and a bimodal wet season with highest rainfall in June and October There are wide variations from this basic pattern between years. Annual rainfall is approximately 61-63 inches per year. The coolest period is from November to January, with an average temperature range from 21-26.5C; the warmest period is April to May when average maximum temperatures rise to 31.5C. The record low is 9C and record high is 38C.

Visitor facilities
Visits to Rio Bravo consist primarily of researchers and university students, though educational outreach programs to the local community also attract visitors.

La Milpa Field Station
La Milpa Field Station is situated in the northeastern portion of the reserve, only three miles from La Milpa Archaeological Site, the third largest Mayan ruin in Belize.  The field station offers a "green" dormitory and four double-unit cabanas, accommodating 30 visitors.  All are constructed of local hardwoods and palm thatch.  Activities include: birding, forest walks, community visits, and Mayan ruin exploration.

Hill Bank Field Station
Hill Bank Field Station is situated along the south shore of the New River Lagoon, along Ramgoat Creek.  Originally, the site was used as a logging camp established by British buccaneers and African slaves in the 18th century to harvest mahogany.  Records show that 400 trees were extracted per year in the early days, rising to 7,000 per year in the late 1970s.  Mahogany supplies dwindled quickly at that rate, and the camp was abandoned in 1982.
Like La Milpa, Hill Bank has both a dormitory and a cabana, sleeping 30 visitors.  Activities include:  forest walks, water-based activities (night crocodile spotting, river trips), frog watches, rain forest research and forestry research, the Hill Bank Reforestation Project, ranger patrols and community visits.  Lamanai is about 2 hours to the north by boat.

Income
Rio Bravo receives funding from donations as well as a number of income-generating projects, including carbon credit-generating sequestration plots.

Ongoing research
Hill Bank Field Station serves as a study site for Las Golondrinas de las Americas.  Nest boxes in the shallows of the lagoon house a study population of the mangrove swallow, and a vacuum insect sample sits behind the cafeteria.

References

External links
Programme for Belize

Protected areas of Belize
Wildlife sanctuaries of North America
Nature conservation in Belize
Protected areas established in 1988